Ras-related protein Rab-13 is a protein that in humans is encoded by the RAB13 gene.

References

Further reading